The Special Operations Group (SOG; also known as Jammu and Kashmir anti-militancy Task Force and JKP anti-militancy Task Force) is a 2300+-strong elite anti-insurgency force chosen from more than 100,000 troopers of the Jammu and Kashmir Police. It was raised in 1994 with the idea of "involving the passive Jammu and Kashmir Police in the anti-terrorist activities and giving a local face to these operations". The J&K police has since been very competent and on the frontlines in anti-terror activities. The SOG members are also the first targets of the militant groups and local separatists alike.

The SOG till date conducts joint operations with other security forces in the region; one example is the 13 March 2000 operation in which Hizbul Mujahideen commander Hamid Gada was killed, and the 6 May 2020 operation in which Hizbul chief Riyaz Naikoo was killed. SOG are well trained and fight shoulder to shoulder with other forces .

Overview 
In every district of the state, the Special Operations Group is headed by Superintendent Police (operations) or Deputy Superintendent Police (operations). The recruits of the Special Operations Group are young men from all the regions of the state and reflect Jammu and Kashmir's various ethnic groups: Kashmiris, Gujjars, Dogras and Sikhs. Many of them have been the victims of militancy in the state. The group is a volunteer force comprising police officers and policemen. The volunteers come for different reasons: some genuinely want to fight anti-India insurgents, while some are motivated by the incentives offered. Bonuses are paid for arresting the militants and capturing arms and ammunition. Other incentives for SOG personnel include out-of-turn promotions.

Whenever there is a militant attack in Jammu and Kashmir, SOG personnel are the first ones to reach the spot. In addition, SOG personnel have been regularly called in to control stone pelting incidents (usually CRPF does that in Valley) when the situation gets out of control for local police. SOG has also conducted many cordon and search operations (CASO) in the main commercial hub of Lal Chowk. The group usually does not wear khaki uniform instead they wear camouflage uniform and cover their faces all the time. This elite force is said to set a dangerous precedent where armed officers are awarded promotions and money rewards for every terrorist eliminated. It is said to be the cause of many false shooting incidents where teenagers pelting stones are termed as violent armed terrorists.

In 2016, there were reports that SOG operations were being "thwarted" by hostile youth. In 2019, the Special Operations Group (SoG) in each district of Jammu and Kashmir were given targets of "one or two terrorists they need to track and target single-mindedly". Assigning individual targets was a change from how militants were tracked previously. SOG are also given training by the National Security Guard (NSG).

Criticism

Usage of excessive force 
The SOG was notorious for alleged human rights violations. So much so that JK Peoples Democratic Party (JK PDP) made it an election promise. Mehbooba Mufti(terrorist sympathizer), who was the PDP Vice-president at the time, was quoted saying that the first thing they would do once in power was disband the SOG.

In 2003, when the JK PDP came into power, the SOG was disbanded. However today the SOG are considered a model anti-insurgency force which could be replicated in other states.

Leadership 
Farooq Khan, IPS was the first head of the Special Operations Group.

See also
 Counter Insurgency Force (West Bengal)
 Special Operation Group (Odisha)
 Greyhounds (police)
 Force One (Mumbai Police)
 Punjab Police SWAT Team
Kerala Thunderbolts

Notes

References

Government of Jammu and Kashmir